Apasevo (Apas) is a rural locality (a village) in Nikolsky Selsoviet, Krasnokamsky District, Bashkortostan, Russia. The population was 111 as of 2010. There are 2 streets.

Geography 
Apasevo is located 32 km northeast of Nikolo-Beryozovka (the district's administrative centre) by road. Nikolskoye is the nearest rural locality.

References 

Rural localities in Krasnokamsky District